The Barrie Arena, sometimes also called the Dunlop Arena, was a 3,000 seat arena located in Barrie, Ontario, at the intersection of Dunlop Street West and Eccles Avenue. It was built in 1932 and served as the main ice hockey venue in the city until the opening of the Barrie Molson Centre in 1995. The arena hosted the Barrie Flyers of the Ontario Hockey League, and also briefly hosted the Barrie Colts while the BMC was under construction.

In March 2008, Barrie City Council approved the demolition of the arena so that the city's new Fire Hall No. 1 could be built on the site. The demolition of the arena commenced in July and was completed in September. Artifacts recovered from the arena, including original wood trusses, were incorporated into a heritage display in the new fire hall.

External links
 The OHL Arena & Travel Guide - Barrie Arena
 The Barrie Examiner - Barrie arena just a memory

Defunct indoor ice hockey venues in Canada
Sports venues in Ontario
Ontario Hockey League arenas
Buildings and structures in Barrie